Michael Ridley is an English author, archaeologist and orientalist.

In 1955 he was present at the opening of the Han tomb at Lei Cheng Uk in China. He has written many books and has spent time as curator at the Rochdale Museum in Lancashire, the Museum of Archaeology at Bournemouth, and served as director of the Tutankhamun Exhibition in Dorchester; as of 2008, he was keeper of Oriental Art and Archaeology at the Russell-Cotes Museum in Bournemouth. He is a Fellow of the Royal Asiatic Society, the Royal Anthropological Institute, and the Society of Antiquaries of Scotland.

Works
 The Art of World Religions — Buddhism, Blandford Press, Dorset, 1978,  
 Oriental Antiques in Color, Arco Publishing, 1978
 Style, Motif and Design in Chinese Art, Blandford Press, 1977
 Treasures from China, The Dolphin Press, 1973
 The Megalithic Art of the Maltese Islands, The Dolphin Press, Christchurch, 1972
 Far Eastern Antiquities, Gifford, London, 1972
 Oriental Art of India, Nepal and Tibet for Pleasure and Investment, Gifford, London, 1970

References 

Year of birth missing (living people)
Living people
English male journalists
Fellows of the Royal Asiatic Society